The Grand Trunk Road (formerly known as Uttarapath, Sarak-e-Azam, Shah Rah-e-Azam, Badshahi Sarak, and Long Walk) is one of Asia's oldest and longest major roads. For at least 2,500 years it has linked Central Asia to the Indian subcontinent.

Chandragupta Maurya, the founder of the ancient Indian Maurya Empire, built this highway along an ancient route called Uttarapatha in the 3rd century BCE, extending it from the mouth of the Ganges to the north-western frontier of the Empire. Further improvements to this road were made under Ashoka. The old route was re-aligned by Sher Shah Suri to Sonargaon and Rohtas. The Afghan end of the road was rebuilt under Mahmud Shah Durrani.   The road was considerably rebuilt in the British period between 1833 and 1860.

The road coincides with current N1, Feni,(Chittagong to Dhaka), N4 & N405 (Dhaka to Sirajganj), N507 (Sirajganj to Natore) and N6 (Natore to Rajshai towards Purneain India; NH 12 (Purnea to Bakkhali), NH 27 (Purnea to Patna), NH 19 (Kolkata to Agra), NH 44 (Agra to Jalandhar via New Delhi, Sonipat, Panipat, Ambala and Ludhiana) and NH 3 (Jalandhar to Attari, Amritsar in India towards Lahore in Pakistan) via Wagah; N-5 (Lahore, Gujranwala, Gujrat, Lalamusa, Jhelum, Rawalpindi, Peshawar and Khyber Pass towards Jalalabad in Afghanistan) in Pakistan and AH1 (Torkham-Jalalabad to Kabul) to Ghazni in Afghanistan.

Over the centuries, the road acted as one of the major trade routes in the region and facilitated both travel and postal communication. The Grand Trunk Road is still used for transportation in present-day Indian subcontinent, where parts of the road have been widened and included in the national highway system.

History

Ancient times 
The Buddhist literature and Indian epics such as Mahabharata provide the existence of Grand Trunk road even before the Maurya Empire and was called Uttarapatha or the "Northern road". The road connected the eastern region of India with Central Asia and Ancient Greece.

Mauryan Empire 
The precursor of the modern Grand Trunk road was built by the emperor Chandragupta Maurya and was based on the Persian Royal Road (more accurately, its eastern stretch, the Great Khurasan Road that ran from Media to Bactria). During the time of the Mauryan Empire in the 3rd century BCE, overland trade between India and several parts of Western Asia and Bactria world went through the cities of the north-west, primarily Takshashila and Purushapura (present-day Taxila and Peshawar respectively, in Pakistan). Takshashila was well connected by roads with other parts of the Mauryan Empire. The Mauryas had maintained this very ancient highway from Takshashila to Patliputra (present-day Patna in India). Chandragupta Maurya had a whole army of officials overseeing the maintenance of this road as told by the Greek diplomat Megasthenes who spent fifteen years at the Mauryan court.

The route of Chandragupta was built over the ancient "Uttarapatha" or the Northern Road, which had been mentioned by Pāṇini. The emperor Ashoka had it recorded in his edict about having trees planted, wells built at every half kos and many "nimisdhayas", which is often translated as rest-houses along the route for the travelers. The emperor Kanishka is also known to have controlled the Uttarapatha.

Suri and Mughal Empires 
Sher Shah Suri, the medieval ruler of the Sur Empire, took to repair The Chandragupta's Royal Road in the 16th century. The old route was further rerouted at Sonargaon and Rohtas and its breadth increased, a sarai was built, the number of kos minars and baolis increased. Gardens were also built alongside some sections of the highway. Those who stopped at the sarai were provided food for free. His son Islam Shah Suri constructed an additional sarai in-between every sarai originally built by Sher Shah Suri on the road toward Bengal. More sarais were built under the Mughals. Jahangir under his reign issued a decree that all sarais be built of burnt brick and stone. Broad-leaved trees were planted in the stretch between Lahore and Agra and he built bridges over all water bodies that were situated on the path of the highways. The route was referred to as "Sadak-e-Azam" by Suri, and "Badshahi Sadak" during Mughals.

British Empire 

In the 1830s the East India Company started a program of metalled road construction, for both commercial and administrative purposes. The road, now named the Grand Trunk Road, from Calcutta, through Delhi, to Kabul, Afghanistan was rebuilt at a cost of £1000/mile. 

The road is mentioned in a number of literary works including those of Foster and Rudyard Kipling. Kipling described the road as: "Look! Look again! and chumars, bankers and tinkers, barbers and bunnias, pilgrims – and potters – all the world going and coming. It is to me as a river from which I am withdrawn like a log after a flood. And truly the Grand Trunk Road is a wonderful spectacle. It runs straight, bearing without crowding India's traffic for fifteen hundred miles – such a river of life as nowhere else exists in the world."

Republic of India 
The ensemble of historic sites along the road in India was submitted to the tentative list of UNESCO World Heritage Sites in 2015, under the title "Sites along the Uttarapath, Badshahi Sadak, Sadak-e-Azam,Banho, Grand Trunk Road". The Indian sections of the Grand Trunk Road coincide with NH 19 and NH 44 of the National Highways in India.

Psephologists sometimes refer to the area around the GT Road as the "GT Road belt" it is also known as Gujarat road sometimes within the context of elections. For example, during the elections in Haryana the area on either side of the GT Road from Ambala to Sonipat, which has 28 legislative assembly constituencies where there is no dominance of one caste or community, is referred to as the "GT road belt of Haryana".

Gallery

See also

 Royal Road
 Roman roads
 Via Regia
 Silk Road – ancient Sino-Indo-European route
 Via Maris (International Trunk Road) – modern name of main ancient international route between Egypt and Mesopotamia

Modern roads in Asia

 AH1, or Asian Highway 1 – the longest route of the Asian Highway Network, running from Japan to Turkey
 Asian Highway Network (AH) aka the Great Asian Highway - project to improve the highway systems in Asia

Afghanistan
 Highway 1 (Afghanistan) –  circular road network inside Afghanistan

Pakistan
 National Highways of Pakistan, all government highways
 Motorways of Pakistan – network of major expressways

India
 National highways in India – network of government-managed highways
 Expressways in India – the highest class of roads in the Indian road network
 Golden Quadrilateral – highway network connecting major centres of northern, western, southern and eastern India
 National Highways Development Project – a project to upgrade and widen major highways in India
 National Highways Authority of India

Notes

References

External links 

 Farooque, Abdul Khair Muhammad (1977), Roads and Communications in Mughal India.  Delhi: Idarah-i Adabiyat-i Delli.
 Weller, Anthony (1997), Days and Nights on the Grand Trunk Road: Calcutta to Khyber.  Marlowe & Company.
 Kipling, Rudyard (1901), Kim.  Considered one of Kipling's finest works, it is set mostly along the Grand Trunk Road. Free e-texts are available, for instance here.
 
 
 
 
 National Highway Authority of India
 National Highway Authority of Pakistan
 NPR: Along the Grand Trunk Road

AH1
Roads in Asia
Roads in Afghanistan
Roads in Bangladesh
Roads in India
Roads in Pakistan
Ancient roads and tracks
Trade routes
Maurya Empire
Sur Empire
British India
History of transport in India
History of transport in Pakistan
Roads in Delhi
Roads in Khyber Pakhtunkhwa
Roads in Punjab, India
Roads in Punjab, Pakistan
Roads in Uttar Pradesh
Roads in West Bengal
Rail transport in Howrah
Transport in Kabul
Transport in Lahore
Historic trails and roads in India
History of transport in Uttar Pradesh